Content editing, also known as substantive editing, comprehensive editing, macro editing, or heavy editing, is a form of copy  editing that evaluates the overall formatting, style, and content of a document in order to optimize visual design and comprehensibility. Comprehensive editors are a type of language professional.

General features
Content editing does not typically involve the use of a handbook, guide, or manual, and focuses instead on what will make the substance of the text more comprehensible based on the subjective assessment of the editor. The process often requires changes based on rhetorical questions related to ease of understanding and functionality. Content editing focuses on the general conceptual intent, content, organization, and writing style of the text in consideration.

Content editing can require effort beyond that of basic copy editing, and in particular demands editorial judgment, because guidelines are often less strict. It can be time consuming because it requires the entire document to be conceptually deconstructed broader than that of specific diction or syntax. This could mean reorganizing sections or restructuring the document as a whole. 

Effective content editing can allow a confusing document to be more clear and precise, as well as easier to read. Content edits not only allow an improvement in readability, but also visual appeal. Tables, graphs, and placement of images can be components of effective content editing as well.

Complications
Unlike copyediting, which usually involves a set of rules, content editing has less strict guidelines, beyond the general requirement that the changes made result in better readability. It anticipates the needs of the reader, and so can lead to difficulty making more subtle changes, as it requires an understanding of the intended audience. Also, complications may appear if the content is edited by the writer themselves and (s)he may not see their own mistakes. Thus, in such cases editing tools are used to ensure the writing is error free.

References 

Copy editing
Types of editors
Writing occupations